Viacheslav Dinerchtein (born October 30, 1976) is a prominent violist and an avid promoter of both novel and overlooked viola repertoire.  His performances as a recitalist and chamber musician have taken him to prestigious venues, such as the Kennedy Center, Carnegie Hall, and Palacio de Bellas Artes. He has appeared in a large number of music festivals in both North and South America and in Europe and has been a guest artist at International Viola Congresses.  Dinerchtein is the dedicatee of several modern compositions for viola, president of the Swiss Viola Society, and an editor for music publishing houses Amadeus Verlag and Ovation Press.

Dinerchtein was born in Belarus and immigrated to Mexico in 1991. He resides with his family in Zurich, Switzerland.

His teachers include his father Boris Dinerchtein, Joseph de Pasquale at the Peabody Conservatory, and Roland Vamos at Northwestern University.
Dinerchtein holds the title of Doctor of Musical Arts from Northwestern University.

References

External links
 Official Website
 International Viola Society
 Swiss Viola Society 
 Ovation Press

Living people
Violists
1976 births
Mensans